Rob Mayes is an American actor, musician, and model. He is best known for starring as the title character in the 2012 horror comedy film John Dies at the End, as well as portraying Tommy Nutter in the short-lived comedy-drama television series Jane by Design. He also played Barry in the 2019 film Maybe I'm Fine.

Early life 
Mayes was raised in Pepper Pike, Ohio,  He started modeling when he was five years old. 

He attended the US Naval Academy in Annapolis, MD.  After leaving the Naval Academy, he focused on songwriting and released a seven-track pop album called Glimpses of Truth.

Career 
Two weeks after moving to New York City in 2007, Mayes was hired for a one-episode role in Law & Order: Special Victims Unit. In 2008, he played the lead role in the MTV musical television film The American Mall.

Mayes had guest starring roles on Cold Case, Valentine, Bones, and Medium and played the lead role in the 2010 film Ice Castles.

In 2012, he starred as John in John Dies at the End, which premiered at the 2012 Sundance Film Festival.

In 2013, he had a recurring role as Tommy Nutter in Jane by Design and guest starring roles in NCIS, The Glades, and 90210.

After a recurring role on The Client List, he portrayed Matthew Blackwood in the 2013 drama film Burning Blue, which was based on the 1992 play of the same name.

In 2014, played Troy Quinn in Legends.

Filmography

Film

Television

References

External links 

Living people
1984 births
American male film actors
American male television actors
Male actors from Cleveland
American people of Lithuanian descent
21st-century American male actors